N. W. M. Jayantha Wijesekara is a Sri Lankan politician and former member of the Parliament of Sri Lanka.

References

Year of birth missing (living people)
Living people
Sri Lankan Buddhists
Sri Lanka Freedom Party politicians
United People's Freedom Alliance politicians
Members of the 13th Parliament of Sri Lanka